Lee John Hodgson (born 29 June 1986) is an English first-class cricketer. He is a right-handed batsman and a right-arm medium-fast bowler who played for Yorkshire, having previously appeared for Surrey.

Hodgson began his cricketing career playing in the Cockspur Cup for Saltburn C.C. - playing one match in the 2004 competition, and one the following year. Hodgson started his Second XI career for MCC Young Cricketers in 2006, continuing to play for them in 2007.

Hodgson's one day career began in August 2008, making his Pro40 debut against Warwickshire. While he did not bat in the game, he bowled four overs, without capturing a wicket. Hodgson picked up his debut first-class appearance for Surrey against Nottinghamshire in September 2008.  He appeared in three first-class matches for Yorkshire between  2009 and 2011.

In September 2011, Yorkshire County Cricket Club announced that Hodgson was being released by the county.

References

1986 births
Living people
English cricketers
Surrey cricketers
Yorkshire cricketers
Cricketers from Middlesbrough
English cricketers of the 21st century